Nikamoto (二家本) is a Japanese surname. Notable people with the surname include:

 Ryosuke Nikamoto (born 1986), Japanese bassist
 Tatsumi Nikamoto (born 1953), Japanese actor

See also
 Nakamoto

Japanese-language surnames